Ian Mariano (born 7 October 1990) is a Guamanian international footballer who plays for Bank of Guam Strykers. He made his first appearance for the Guam national football team in 2007. Ian has Filipino blood. He is one quarter Filipino due to his grandmother who comes from Samar, Philippines.

International goals

References

1990 births
Living people
People from Tamuning, Guam
Guamanian footballers
Guam international footballers
Guam Shipyard players
Guamanian people of Filipino descent
Expatriate footballers in the Philippines
Association football defenders